Room 785 was a children's television programme broadcast on the BFBS 1 channel, part of the British Forces Broadcasting Service. It had a similar format to CBBC in that the presenters were situated in a small studio and introduced the programmes from there. There was more emphasis on emailing and texting in to the show, as it was broadcast wherever BFBS was received and allowed children to send messages to their parents who may have been on operations.

The show, which took its name from the British Forces Post Office number used as its address, was previously known as Children's SSVC.

Similar to the output of the BFBS channels in general, the show's broadcasts were taken directly from those shown on CBBC, CITV and Channel 5.

Programmes

0-9
50/50
64 Zoo Lane

A
The Adventures of Captain Pugwash
The Adventures of Paddington Bear
Albie
All or Nothing
Alphablocks
Alvin and the Chipmunks
The Amazing Adrenalini Brothers
American Dragon: Jake Long
Andy Pandy
Angelina Ballerina
Angelmouse
The Angry Beavers
Animaniacs
Animal Stories
Anthony Ant
Archibald the Koala
Art Attack
Arthur
Astro Boy
Atomic Betty

B
Balamory
Barmy Aunt Boomerang
The Baskervilles
BB3B
Beachcomber Bay
The Beeps
Bernard's Watch
Big Meg, Little Meg
Bill & Ben
Bob the Builder
Boogie Beebies
Boohbah
The Book of Pooh
Blue Peter
Brambly Hedge
Brilliant Creatures
The Brothers Flub

C
Captain Scarlet and the Mysterons
CardCaptors
The Caribou Kitchen
ChuckleVision
Clarissa Explains It All
Clifford the Big Red Dog
Custer's Last Stand-up

D
Dappledown Farm
Dani's House
Dennis the Menace (1996 series)
Dennis the Menace (2009 series)
Don't Eat the Neighbours
Dr Otter
Dream Street
Driver Dan's Story Train

E
Engie Benjy
Enid Blyton's Enchanted Lands
Everything's Rosie

F
The Fairly OddParents!
Fanboy and Chum Chum
Fat Dog Mendoza
Fiddley Foodle Bird
Fifi and the Flowertots
Fimbles
Fireman Sam
Fleabag Monkeyface
Fly Tales
The Foxbusters
Frankenstein's Cat
Franklin
Funnybones

G
Gadget Boy & Heather
Galidor: Defenders of the Outer Dimension
Gerry Anderson's New Captain Scarlet
Grange Hill
The Greedysaurus Gang

H
Hilltop Hospital
Home Farm Twins
Horrid Henry
How 2

I
iCarly

J
Jelly Jamm
Jungle Run

K
Kid vs. Kat
Kipper

L
The Lampies
The Likeaballs
Little Bear
Little Monsters
Littlest Pet Shop
Live and Kickin'
Looney Tunes

M
Mad for It
The Magic Key
Maisy
The Mask: Animated Series
Max Steel
MechaNick
Mega Babies
Meeow!
Merlin the Magical Puppy
Merrie Melodies
Mickey Mouse Works
Misery Guts
Mist: Sheepdog Tales
Mona the Vampire
Monster TV
Mortified
Mopatop's Shop
The Mr. Men Show
Muffin the Mule
Mumble Bumble
The Mummy
My Parents are Aliens

N
Noah and Saskia

O
The Octonauts
OOglies

P
Peppa Pig
Pingu
The Pinky and Perky Show
Pinky and the Brain
Plasmo
Playdays
Pocket Dragon Adventures
Polterguests
Postman Pat
Postman Pat Special Delivery Service
Potatoes and Dragons
Preston Pig
The Prince of Atlantis
Pump It Up

Q
The Quick Trick Show

R
Raven
The Really Wild Show
Recess
The Riddlers
Ripley and Scuff
Roary the Racing Car
Rocket Boy and Toro
Rotten Ralph
Romuald the Reindeer
Round the Twist
Rugrats

S
Salty's Lighthouse
The Secret Show
Sergeant Stripes
Shaun the Sheep
Sheeep
The Singing Kettle
Sir Gadabout: The Worst Knight in the Land
SMart
Sooty Heights
Sooty & Co.
SpongeBob SquarePants
Starhill Ponies
The Story of Tracy Beaker
Strange Dawn
Student Bodies

T
Tales of the Tooth Fairies
Taz-Mania
Teddybears
Teletubbies
There's a Viking in My Bed
Thomas and Friends
Thunderbirds
Timbuctoo
Tiny Planets
Tots TV
The Treacle People
Tweenies

U
Uncle Dad

V

W
Watch My Chops
Watership Down
Waybuloo
What's New Scooby-Doo?
Whizziwig
Wide-Eye
Wiggly Park
The Wild Thornberrys
William's Wish Wellingtons
The Wizards of Waverly Place
The Wombles
The Worst Witch

X

Y
Yoho Ahoy
Yoko! Jakamoko! Toto!

Z
Zot the Dog
ZZZap!

External links
Room 785 – BFBS Television

British children's television series